Raymond Lefebvre (born 28 September 1908, date of death unknown) was a French long-distance runner. He competed in the men's 5000 metres at the 1936 Summer Olympics.

References

1908 births
Year of death missing
Athletes (track and field) at the 1936 Summer Olympics
French male long-distance runners
Olympic athletes of France
Place of birth missing